Kevin Ramírez may refer to:

 Kevin Ramírez (footballer, born 1993), Peruvian midfielder for Willy Serrato
 Kevin Ramírez (footballer, born 1994), Uruguayan midfielder for Club Atlético Tigre
 Kevin Ramírez (footballer, born 1998), Mexican midfielder for Club Atlético Zacatepec